Hockey Club Slovan Bratislava is a professional ice hockey club based in Bratislava, Slovakia. In 2012, it left the Slovak Extraliga and joined the international Kontinental Hockey League (KHL). In 2019, it returned to the Tipos Extraliga. The club has won nine Slovak championships (most recently in 2022), one Czechoslovak championship (1979) and one IIHF Continental Cup (2004), making it the second most successful hockey club in Slovak history after their biggest rival HC Košice. The team plays its home games at Ondrej Nepela Arena, also known as Slovnaft Arena. The team is nicknamed Belasí, which means the "sky blues" in English.

History 
The sports club Slovan Bratislava was founded in 1919 as a football club, then called 1.CsSK Bratislava. In 1921, a hockey section was founded as "CsSK hockey". It played its first game in December 1924 against Wiener EV from Vienna, losing 6–1. In 1948, the name of the club was changed to Slovan Bratislava, which has been kept until today.

For many years following World War II, Slovan was the only Slovak representative in the highest Czechoslovak league, and achieved several second-place finishes in the championship. The only title in the Czechoslovak First Ice Hockey League was achieved under coach Ladislav Horsky in the 1978–79 season. Additionally, the youth teams won several championships.

After the separation of Slovakia and the Czech Republic in 1993, Slovan played in the Slovak Extraliga and won eight championship titles over 19 years.

In addition to the success achieved in Slovakia, Slovan also performed well internationally, with three Spengler Cup wins in a row in 1972, 1973 and 1974. It is also one of only four clubs to play all four seasons of the European Hockey League, progressing to the playoff stage each year. Another highlight was winning the IIHF Continental Cup in the 2003–04 season. From 2011 to 2013, Slovan participated in the European Trophy international pre-season tournament.

KHL 
In March 2012, Slovan filed an application to play in the Kontinental Hockey League (KHL). On 21 June 2012, Slovan Bratislava was officially admitted to the KHL, after they fulfilled all necessary conditions. Founded in 1921, they were the oldest KHL team by a large margin, as there were no ice hockey leagues in the former Union of Soviet Socialist Republics prior to 1946.

2012–13 season 

In May, Slovan signed Rostislav Čada as the new head coach for the first KHL season, who had had a KHL experience from working at Avangard Omsk. After playing two friendly matches against KHL teams and the European Trophy during the summer months, Slovan opened the 2012–13 season with a home game against Ukrainian HC Donbass on 6 September 2012, losing 2–4 in front of a capacity crowd. The first win was achieved 4 days later by defeating Spartak Moscow 2–1 after a shootout. During the NHL lockout between September 2012 and January 2013, the two defenders Ľubomír Višňovský and Andrej Sekera enhanced the team. Slovan ended the season with 78 points as 6th of the Western conference and thus clinched a play-off spot in their first KHL season. In the first play-off round, Slovan played against then-defending champion Dynamo Moscow and lost all four matches.

During the regular season, Slovan had sold out 25 out of its 26 home games with an average attendance of 9,977 spectators, which was the seventh-highest average attendance in Europe that season.

Mascot 
Before the start of 2013–14 season, it was announced that the franchise will have a new mascot called Harvy. The mascot's name was determined by fans and its appearance will be of a bald eagle, which is also on HC Slovan's logo.

Rivalries 

While competing in the Czechoslovak league, Slovan's main rival was HK Dukla Trenčín. While competing in the Slovak Extraliga, Slovan had various rivals around the country, most notably HC Košice and Trenčin

In Slovan's first two seasons in the KHL, its biggest rival was Lev Prague. The rivalry started when, in their first game, HC Lev's Zdeno Chára body-checked Slovan's team captain Miroslav Šatan, after which Šatan was out of the lineup for the rest of the season. The fairness of this hit was the centre of many discussions. The games between Slovan and Lev were among the most anticipated of the season for both teams. However, Lev Praha folded after the 2013–14 season.

Season-by-season record 
This is a partial list of the last ten seasons completed by HC Slovan Bratislava. For the full season-by-season history, see List of HC Slovan Bratislava seasons.

Note: GP = Games played, W = Wins, OTW = Overtime/shootout wins, OTL = Overtime/shootout losses, L = Losses, Pts = Points, GF = Goals for, GA = Goals against Honours 

Domestic
Slovak Extraliga
  Winners (9): 1997–98, 1999–2000, 2001–02, 2002–03, 2004–05, 2006–07, 2007–08, 2011–12, 2021–22
  Runners-up (2): 1998–99, 2009–10
  3rd place (5): 1994–95, 1995–96, 2000–01, 2003–04, 2008–09

Czechoslovak Extraliga
  Winners (1): 1978–79
  Runners-up (8): 1948–49, 1959–60, 1960–61, 1961–62, 1963–64, 1964–65, 1969–70, 1971–72
  3rd place (9): 1945–46, 1946–47, 1947–48, 1962–63, 1965–66, 1968–69, 1970–71, 1972–73, 1979–80

Slovak Hockey League
  Winners (2): 1940–41, 1941–42
  Runners-up (2): 1942–43, 1943–44

1st. Slovak National Hockey League
  Winners (2): 1981–82, 1989–90

2nd. Czechoslovak Hockey League
  Runners-up (1): 1954–55

 International 
IIHF European Cup
  3rd place (1): 1979–80

IIHF Continental Cup
  Winners (1): 2003–04
  3rd place (1): 2000–01

Pre-season
Spengler Cup
  Winners (3): 1972, 1973, 1974

Tatra Cup
  Winners (5): 1974, 1975, 1990, 1997, 1998

Basel Summer Ice Hockey
  Winners (1): 2010

Steel Cup
  Winners (1): 2016

Rona Cup
  Winners (1): 1998

 Players 

 Current roster 

Franchise scoring leaders

These are the top-ten-point-scorers in franchise history. Figures are updated after each completed season.
  – current Slovan playerNote: Pos = Position; GP = Games played; G = Goals; A = Assists; Pts = Points; P/G = Points per game''

Staff

Head coaches 
These are the head coaches of HC Slovan Bratislava since they joined the Czechoslovak Extraliga:

Hall of Fame 
The following players associated with HC Slovan Bratislava have been inducted in various Halls of Fame:

Hockey Hall of Fame 
Hockey Hall of Fame is located in Toronto, Ontario, Canada.

IIHF Hall of Fame 
The IIHF Hall of Fame is intended to honor individuals who have made valuable contributions both internationally and in their home countries.

References

External links 
 Official Website of the HC Slovan Bratislava

 
Slovan Bratislava
Slovan Bratislava
Sport in Bratislava
Slovan Bratislava
Ice hockey clubs established in 1921
1921 establishments in Czechoslovakia
Bobrov Division (KHL)